James Smith (c. 1763 – 1 January 1848) of Monkwood Grove was a Scottish botanist and nurseryman. He founded the Monkwood Botanic Garden in Maybole Parish which included several thousand species of exotic and native British plants. A regular consultant of his more eminent contemporaries, he is credited with the discovery of Primula scotica, Salix caprea pendula and several other species of plants. Owing to his particular interest in the flora of Scotland, he has been described as the "father of Scottish botany."

Biography 
Smith was born around 1763 in Ayrshire, Scotland. In his earlier years, he had been a student of Sir Joseph Banks. Sometime in the eighteenth century, he established a nursery at his home on the Monkwood estate near Minishant along the River Doon, which eventually became the Monkwood Botanic Garden. At Monkwood, he amassed a large collection of rare and valuable plants which, according to Loudon’s Encyclopaedia of Gardening, comprised thirty-five hundred different species of both exotic and indigenous varieties. At his nursery, he employed and mentored his future son-in-law, the botanist John Goldie, for whom Dyopteris goldieana is named. Passing through Monkwood on one occasion, the poet Hew Ainslie wrote in his A Pilgrimage in the Land of Burns (1820) that Smith's garden was "paradisiacal", where plants "of all nations were seated most brotherly together, drinking of the same dews, and dancing to the piping of the same breeze". 
Owing to his vast botanical knowledge and equally formidable collection of plants, Smith was regularly consulted by such contemporary botanists as Sir William Jackson Hooker and Sir James Edward Smith who included his information on botanical subjects in their works. As mentioned in Hooker's Flora Scotica (1821), Smith is credited with the discovery of Primula scotica, Veronica hirsuta and the Kilmarnock Weeping Willow (Salix caprea pendula).

Smith died on 1 January 1848, aged 84. His gravestone in the Ayr Auld Kirkyard erected by his admirers describes him as the "father of Scottish botany," a moniker derived from his particular interest in the flora of Scotland. By the end of the nineteenth century, both the house and garden at Monkwood had gone, however many of Smith's rare plants remain on the grounds.

References 

 Bibliography

 "The Ayrshire Directory for 1830". The Landscape Changes. http://www.maybole.org/community/minishant/book/landscapechanges.htm
 "The Weeping Willow. Salix Baby-Lonica" Chest of Books http://chestofbooks.com/gardening-horticulture/Journal-3/The-Weeping-Willow-Salix-Baby-Lonica.html

1763 births
1848 deaths
Scottish botanists